Shin Su-jong (also Sin Su-jong, ; born February 15, 1988) is a South Korean swimmer, who specialized in breaststroke events. He represented his nation South Korea at the 2008 Summer Olympics, and has won a silver medal, as a member of the men's 4 × 100 m medley relay team, at the 2006 Asian Championships in Singapore.

Shin competed for the South Korean swimming team in the men's 200 m breaststroke at the 2008 Summer Olympics in Beijing. He finished outside the semifinal time in 2:15.88 to slide under the FINA B-cut (2:18.37) at the World Championships one year earlier in Melbourne, Australia. Rallying from sixth at the 150-metre turn in heat two, Shin fought off a three-way sprint challenge from Miguel Molina of the Philippines and Martti Aljand of Estonia on the final lap to snatch the fourth spot in 2:16.21. Shin failed to advance into the semifinals, as he placed forty-third out of 53 swimmers in the prelims.

References

External links
NBC 2008 Olympics profile

1988 births
Living people
South Korean male breaststroke swimmers
Olympic swimmers of South Korea
Swimmers at the 2006 Asian Games
Swimmers at the 2008 Summer Olympics
People from Asan
Asian Games competitors for South Korea
Sportspeople from South Chungcheong Province
21st-century South Korean people